The following is a list of episodes of Always Greener.

Series overview

Season 1 (2001-02)

Season 2 (2002-03)

See also
Always Greener

References

General
 Zuk, T. Always Greener: season 1 episode guide, Australian Television Information Archive. Retrieved 6 June 2008.
 Zuk, T. Always Greener: season 2 episode guide, Australian Television Information Archive. Retrieved 6 June 2008.
 TV.com editors. Always Greener Episode Guide, TV.com. Retrieved 6 June 2008.
 IMDb editors. Always Greener episode guide, Internet Movie Database. Retrieved 6 June 2008.
Specific

Lists of comedy-drama television series episodes